The 2017 Quick Lane Bowl was a postseason college football bowl game, played at Ford Field in Detroit, Michigan, on December 26, 2017.
The game featured the Duke Blue Devils of the Atlantic Coast Conference and the Northern Illinois Huskies of the Mid-American Conference.  The fourth annual Quick Lane Bowl, it was one of the 2017–18 bowl games that concluded the 2017 FBS football season.  The game was sponsored by Quick Lane tire and auto centers.

Teams 
The game featured the Duke Blue Devils against the Northern Illinois Huskies.

This was the first meeting between the schools.

Duke 

This was the thirteenth bowl game in school history for Duke and the Blue Devils' first to be played in Michigan.

Northern Illinois 

This was the twelfth bowl game in school history for Northern Illinois and the Huskies' first to be played in Michigan.

Game summary

Scoring summary

Statistics

Source:

References

External links
 Game summary at ESPN

2017–18 NCAA football bowl games
2017
2017
2017
2017 in sports in Michigan
December 2017 sports events in the United States